Seo Hyun-woo (born 20 November 1983) is a South Korean actor. He is well known for his role as reporter Kim Moo-jin in 2020 drama Flower of Evil.

Filmography

Film

Television series

Web series

Hosting

Awards and nominations

References 

Living people
21st-century South Korean male actors
South Korean musical theatre actors
South Korean male film actors
South Korean male television actors
1983 births